The 1998 Speedway Grand Prix Qualification or GP Challenge was a series of motorcycle speedway meetings used to determine the 16 riders that qualified for the 1998 Speedway Grand Prix to join the other 8 riders that finished in the leading positions from the 1997 Speedway Grand Prix.

There was a late change to the qualifying when the Grand Prix increased to 24 permanent riders. Therefore 4 riders would qualify straight from the Intercontinental and Continental finals and 9 riders would qualify through the GP Challenge (originally just 4). The final 3 GP places would go to wildcards.

Piotr Protasiewicz won the GP Challenge.

Format
 First Round - 5 riders each from Sweden &  Denmark, 3 riders each from Finland & Norway to Scandinavian Final
 First Round - 32 riders from Continental quarter finals to Continental semi-finals
 First Round - 8 riders from British final to Overseas Final
 First Round - 4 riders from Australian/New Zealand final to Overseas Final
 First Round - 4 riders from United States final to Overseas Final
 Second Round - 8 riders from Scandinavian final to Intercontinental Final
 Second Round - 8 riders from Overseas final to Intercontinental Final
 Second Round - 16 riders from Continental semi-finals to Continental Final
 Third Round - 7 riders from positions 9-15 from the 1997 Grand Prix to GP Challenge
 Third Round - 2 riders from the Continental Final to 1998 Grand Prix and 4 to GP Challenge
 Third Round - 2 riders from the Intercontinental Final to 1998 Grand Prix and 5 to GP Challenge
 Final Round - 9 riders from the GP Challenge to the 1998 Grand Prix

First round

Continental quarter finals

Second round

Overseas Final
 8 riders to Intercontinental Final

Scandinavian Final
8 riders to Intercontinental final

Continental semi finals

Third round
7 riders from positions 9-15 from the 1997 Speedway Grand Prix to GP Challenge

Intercontinental Final
 2 riders direct to Grand Prix, 5 riders to GP Challenge

Continental Final 
2 riders direct to Grand Prix, 4 riders to GP Challenge
26 July 1997  Lonigo

Final Round

GP Challenge
4 riders (changed to 9) to 1998 Grand Prix
5 October 1997  Wiener Neustadt

References 

Speedway Grand Prix Qualification
Speedway Grand Prix Qualifications
Qualification